Saint Joseph Catholic Church is a Black Catholic church in the Old Town Historic District of Alexandria, Virginia.  

It was founded in 1916 with assistance from Katherine Drexel and the Josephites, as a mission church for African Americans. In 1967, Richmond bishop John J. Russell established the mission as a parish of the Diocese of Arlington in Virginia. 

The church is a contributing property in the Uptown–Parker–Gray Historic District, listed on the National Register of Historic Places in 2010.

History

Before the Civil War, slaves from around Northern Virginia worshipped at Basilica of St. Mary in Alexandria, Virginia, with slave owners. During the Civil War, Alexandria's population swelled with contrabands (escaped slaves), who also worshipped at St. Mary.  However, after the Civil War, Jim Crow laws restricted the rights of black Americans. Black Catholics were forced to worship from the back of the church, then told not to sit with the main congregation. They sat in the north wing, had their own religious education classes, and were married by priests in their homes.   By the turn of the 20th century, black Catholics were served by their own priest, Rev. Charles Hannigan of the Josephites whose mission was to serve the needs of Native and African American communities. He traveled from Richmond each week to conduct Mass for the worshiping black Catholics.

By 1913, black Catholics wanted their own church.  Thomas Blair, a black man and sexton of Basilica of St. Mary for over thirty years, convened a committee to explore the possibility of establishing a church.  Working with Fr. Hannigan, Mr. Blair held meetings at the Basilica's lyceum with his fellow  and drafted a letter to the Bishop Denis J. O’Connell of Richmond asking to form themselves into a new congregation.   The appeal was approved and, despite the fact that African Americans were among the poorest of residents of Alexandria, Mr. Blair held a variety of fund-raising activities and raised the funds to purchase the property.

In 1914, the committee acquired property at the historically black neighborhood called Uptown, at the northwest corner of Wythe and North Columbus streets.  While Mr. Blair and the community raised additional funds for building the church, Hannigan convinced Katherine Drexel, founder of the Sisters of the Blessed Sacrament and member of a wealthy Philadelphia family, to donate $8,000 towards the building of St. Joseph Catholic Church.  That was half of the expected cost of the church; the remaining amount was to be raised by the parishioners.   In 1915, Rev. Joseph J. Kelly, another Josephite, was assigned to the new congregation.  St. Joseph Catholic Church was dedicated on May 14, 1916. Two weeks later, Mr. Blair, considered the father of St. Joseph Church, died at the age of 65.

Washington architects Murphy & Olmsted designed the red-brick, English Gothic-style church.  In 1915, Rev, Joseph J. Kelly served as the first pastor, who lived in the altar boys’ sacristy unit the completion of the rectory in 1921.   He served at St. Joseph's until 1936.  The parish grew large enough within a few years to build its own school. Although a school began operating within the church building in 1916 to serve the local African American community, a new school was built in 1931 and staffed by the Oblate Sisters of Providence, an order of African American sisters.  They taught at the school until 1969 when the school closed.   In 1967, Richmond Bishop John J. Russell re-designated St. Joseph's from an African American mission church to a territorial parish within the Roman Catholic Diocese of Arlington in Virginia. 

St. Joseph's is associated with the Josephites to this day and is the only Black parish in the diocese.

References

External links
 Official Parish Site 
 Josephite Fathers Official Website
 Roman Catholic Diocese of Arlington Official Site

Churches in the Roman Catholic Diocese of Arlington
Roman Catholic churches completed in 1916
Churches in Alexandria, Virginia
1916 establishments in Virginia
20th-century Roman Catholic church buildings in the United States
Roman Catholic churches in Virginia
African-American Roman Catholic churches
Josephite churches in the United States